Nuestro Mundo (literally "Our World," also Grupo Nuestro Mundo meaning "Our World Group") was the first gay rights organization in Latin America. It was founded by Héctor Anabitarte in Buenos Aires, Argentina in late 1967. In 1971, it joined with several similar organizations to form the Frente de Liberación Homosexual.

Formation 
Nuestro Mundo was founded by Héctor Anabitarte, a trade unionist. He and the other leaders of the group were expelled from the Communist Party of Argentina for being homosexuals.

When the group was formed in the late 1960s, Argentina was ruled by the National Reorganization Process, a military dictatorship that repressed LGBT people. Nuestro Mundo largely focused on bringing awareness to the oppression of Argentina's LGBT community and ending police brutality against homosexuals rather than engaging in political activity. Anabitarte described the group's demands as "more reformist than revolutionary."

Frente de Liberación Homosexual 

In August 1971, Nuestro Mundo merged with several other activist groups to form the Frente de Liberación Homosexual ("Homosexual Liberation Front"), also known as the FLH. Other groups which joined the FLH included Safo, Eros, and Bandera Negra. This new group was more politically active than those that preceded it, including Nuestro Mundo itself. The FLH eventually dissolved as a result of the 1976 Argentine coup d'état.

References 

LGBT rights in Argentina
LGBT history in Argentina
1967 establishments in Argentina